Kim Young-joo (born 27 July 1955) is a South Korean basketball-player-turned politician previously served as President Moon Jae-in's first Minister of Employment and Labor from 2017 to 2018. She is the first woman to lead the labour ministry since its foundation in 1981 and its preceding agency in 1948.

She was a basketball player for Seoul Trust Bank (now absorbed into Hana Bank). She then worked at the Bank where she faced gender discrimination which led her to join its trade union. She later joined its leadership board and eventually became the deputy chair of Korea Financial Industry Union and the first woman to assume this post.

In 1999 she first entered politics when she was recruited by Kim Dae-jung. She has consistently took senior roles in her party and its succeeding parties such as its secretary-general and one of elected members of its Supreme Council.

She was nominated and appointed as President Moon Jae-in's first Minister of Employment and Labor. She was replaced after facing opposition parties and media's strong critics of "decrease in weekly working hours and increase in minimum wage" policy, which she was responsible of as labour minister and was one of main socio-economic campaign promises of Moon, throughout her time as Minister.

Kim completed her tertiary education in her 40s - an undergraduate degree in Korean language and literature from Korea National Open University and a master's degree in economics from Sogang University.

Electoral history

References 

Living people
Korea University alumni
Korea National Open University alumni
Sogang University alumni
People from Seoul
1955 births
Women government ministers of South Korea
Members of the National Assembly (South Korea)
Uri Party politicians
Minjoo Party of Korea politicians
Labor ministers of South Korea
South Korean trade union leaders
Deputy Speakers of the National Assembly (South Korea)
Female members of the National Assembly (South Korea)